was a Japanese voice actor who was born in Kyoto Prefecture, Japan. As a youth, he was a member of a performing arts troupe. Yoshimura was diagnosed with subarachnoid hemorrhage in March 1990, and died on November 27, 1991, at 37 years old, from complications of the disease.

Filmography
Osu!! Karate Bu

Television

Anime
Aoi Blink (Satchi)
F (manga) (Yasuda)
Moero! Top Striker (unknown)
Machine Robo: Revenge of Cronos (Magna Rock)Ojamanga Yamada-kun (Fukuda)Ranma ½ (Maomolin (1st voice) (later replaced by Masahiro Anzai after his death), Ebiten, Wu)Tsuide ni Tonchinkan (Nukesaku Aida)Zettai Muteki Raijin Ō (Taidā)

OVACapricorn (anime) (unknown)Zettai Muteki Raijin Ō (Taidā)

Live actionOne, Two, Three, Mathematics (いちにのさんすう) (Yoshi)Voice-oversThe A-Team (unknown)Red Dawn (Robert Morris)Teenage Mutant Ninja Turtles II: The Secret of the Ooze'' (Donatello)

References

External links
 

1954 births
1991 deaths
Japanese male voice actors
Male actors from Kyoto Prefecture
Deaths from subarachnoid hemorrhage